These are the official results of the Women's Heptathlon at the 1996 Summer Olympics in Atlanta, Georgia, United States.

Medalists

Final classification

See also
 1996 Hypo-Meeting

References

External links
 Official Report
 Results

Heptathlon
1996
1996 in women's athletics
Women's events at the 1996 Summer Olympics